Sardopaladilhia marianae is a species of very small aquatic snail, an operculate gastropod mollusk in the family Moitessieriidae.

Description

Distribution
This species occurs in the Atlantic Ocean off Spain and Portugal.

References

Moitessieriidae
Gastropods described in 2003